Echeconnee Creek is a stream in the U.S. state of Georgia. It is a tributary to the Ocmulgee River.

Echeconnee is a name derived from the Muskogee language meaning "deer trap". Many variant names have been recorded, including "Echconna Creek", "Echeconno Creek", "Ichiconna Creek", "Icho-con-naugh Creek", "Icho-conno Creek", "Ichocunno Creek", "Itcheecono Creek", "Itchocunnah Creek", "Itchocunnau Creek", "Itchocunno Creek", and "Itchy Creek".

References

Rivers of Georgia (U.S. state)
Rivers of Houston County, Georgia
Rivers of Bibb County, Georgia
Rivers of Crawford County, Georgia
Rivers of Peach County, Georgia
Rivers of Monroe County, Georgia
Rivers of Upson County, Georgia
Rivers of Lamar County, Georgia